The Grantsmanship Center, a training and resources organization for non-profit, academic and government agencies, offers workshops, publications, and consultation services throughout the United States and internationally. The Center was founded on 1972 in Los Angeles, where it is still headquartered. The Center's training programs and publications cover grant proposal writing, grants management, applying for federal grants, social enterprise for non-profits, and writing proposals for research funding. As of 2019, The Center had trained more than 140,000 people.

History
The Grantsmanship Center was founded in 1972 by Norton J. Kiritz as a 501(c)(3) nonprofit to offer grantsmanship training to members of nonprofits and government agencies. Before this time, no such training existed and small organizations often lacked the skills to compete for grant opportunities. The Center began as a local project in Los Angeles, but as word of its alumni's successes spread, demand for trainings rapidly expanded. Soon organizations in other cities were asking to host training programs in their own communities. By 1975, The Grantsmanship Center was conducting more than 100 workshops a year across the United States. Since 1972 The Grantsmanship Center has trained over 140,000 people.

In the late 1970s and early 1980s, the Center also had an office in Washington, DC.

In 1984, after being seriously affected by the federal spending cutbacks of the Reagan Administration, The Center was on the brink of collapse with its board recommending closing the organization down entirely. Mr. Kiritz converted the Center into a for-profit corporation and took on full responsibility for the organization himself.

In 1999, The Center created the Alumni Membership Program to provide support for graduates returning to their organizations.  The Center's Alumni Membership includes review of a proposal, access to The Grantsmanship Center's funding databases, access to 990-PFs and other benefits.  Alumni also receive access to an online forum. Participants receive either a 6 or 12 month membership as part of tuition, depending on which class they take.

In 2006, Mr. Kiritz died. His wife of 22 years, Cathleen, took over the running of the organization.

Workshops
The Grantsmanship Center provides workshops to individuals and organizations across the United States. It has also done workshops internationally when requested.

The Grantsmanship Training Program is a five-day workshop designed for both novice and experienced grant seekers. It is the most frequently attended workshop. After first learning the basics, participants break into groups, write grant proposals together and then review other group's proposals. Participants later look into finding funding sources.

The Social Enterprise for Nonprofits training is a two-day workshop which teaches participants about generating unrestricted funds using methods generally considered to be in the realm of for-profit organizations.

The Research Proposal Workshop is a three say seminar which teaches academic faculty members, postdoctoral and graduate students, and other researchers how to obtain funding for their own research projects.

The Competing for Federal Grants training is a five-day workshop which focuses on obtaining grants from the US Government.

The Essential Grant Skills training is a two-day, shortened version of the Grantsmanship Training Program, which skips the hands on portion of the training.

Project Grantsmanship is an enhanced and subsidized version of the Grantsmanship Training Program which is offered to paid employees and board members of Los Angeles area based nonprofits. The program differs from The Grantsmanship Training Program in that 90% of the tuition is paid for by local foundations, it is fully catered and has a Q&A session at the end with local grantmakers. It is funded by the Annenberg Foundation, Dwight Stuart Youth Fund, Ralph M. Parsons Foundation, and the California Community Foundation.

The Center also creates customized training workshops based on the requests of its clients.

Publications
The Grantsmanship Center has produced many publication for grantseekers throughout its history.

In 1972, Mr. Kiritz wrote and published Program Planning & Proposal Writing, a 12-page, easy to read guide to getting a grant proposal accepted. A number of additional articles on the topic which were later published in The Grantsmanship Center News magazine are now available in a 48-page expanded version of Programming Planning & Proposal Writing. There are more than a million copies of the publication in print and many government, foundation, and corporate grantmakers adopted it as their preferred application format. It has been called "the proposal writer's bible" and is the most widely read publication in nonprofit history.

Grantsmanship: Program Planning & Proposal Writing, 2nd ed., published in 2017, was updated and expanded by Barbara Floersch, former Chief of Training & Curriculum at The Grantsmanship Center.

The Grantsmanship Center News, a groundbreaking magazine, challenged the world of philanthropy by championing the rights of minorities and the poor. The magazine, which was also first published in 1972, was noted for thoughtful, edgy reporting. A subsequent publication, The Grantsmanship Center Magazine, ran from the early 1990s until 2005. At their peak, these publications reached a circulation of over 200,000 copies. These periodicals "paved the way for the journalists who today scrutinize charities and foundations with growing sophistication and skepticism,". Archives are now available at the Library of Congress.

Currently the Grantsmanship Center publishes {Centered}, a monthly email containing digests of current publications along with a featured article targeted to grantseekers and grantmakers.

References

External links
 

1972 establishments in California
Educational institutions established in 1972
Non-profit organizations based in California